De Anza High School is a secondary school located in Richmond, California, United States, named after Spanish explorer Juan Bautista de Anza. It is part of the West Contra Costa Unified School District and serves northeast Richmond, the unincorporated communities of El Sobrante and Rollingwood and a small portion of San Pablo.

History

The school originally opened in 1955. In 2005 local voters passed Measure J, a bond measure which included $161 million to completely rebuild the De Anza campus. Reconstruction began in 2009 with a new all-weather track and artificial-turf football field, along with the demolition of the gym and other site preparation work. The new facility was opened for the start of the 2013 - 2014 school year.

The school offers four academies: Health Academy, Information Technology Academy, Law Academy, and Air Force JROTC.

School clubs include Anime Club, Asian-Pacific Islander, Art Association Club, Banju Community Club, Black Student Union, Christian Club, Freedom of Movement, French, Gay/Straight Alliance, Glee Club, Graffiti Arts, Guitar, Hip-Hop Club, Health Occupational Society of America (HOSA), Interact, MESA, Outdoor Rec, Poetry, Robotics, Shimada, Speech & Debate, Video Game Club, and Yearbook.

Test scores

Notable alumni

 Brian Abshire (1982): 1988 Olympian in the 3000 meter steeplechase; former USA indoor 3000 meter record holder
 Joel Beck (1961): early "underground" comic artist
 Jeff Becerra (1982):Vocalist and former bassist of death metal band Possessed 
 Davone Bess (2008): NFL player (transferred his sophomore year to Skyline)
 Greg Bracelin (1975): former NFL player
 Ken Burrow (1966): NFL player, Atlanta Falcons, 1971
 Les Claypool (1981): Primus bassist and lead singer
 Kirk Hammett (1980): Metallica lead guitarist
 Frank Lockett (1985): NFL player, Miami Dolphins
 Locksmith (Davood Ali Asgari) (2002): rapper and member of former duo The Frontline
 Silkk the Shocker (Vyshonn Miller) (1994): No Limit rapper and member of TRU
 Wade F. Wilson (2005): Actor, portrays Michael in the Netflix's series "Dear White People"

References

External links

 

Buildings and structures in Richmond, California
Education in Richmond, California
High schools in Contra Costa County, California
Public high schools in California
1955 establishments in California